Ajay Mitchell  is a Belgian college basketball player for UC Santa Barbara Gauchos of the Big West Conference.

Early life
Mitchell grew up in Ans, Belgium. He began playing for Limburg United's youth team in 2019 and made two appearances with the senior team in the Pro Basketball League during the 2019–20 season.  Mitchell played solely with the senior team during the 2020–21 season while maintaining his amateur status. After the season he committed to play college basketball at the University of California, Santa Barbara.

College career
Mitchell played in 27 games during his freshman season and was named the Big West Conference Freshman of the Year and second team All-Big West after averaging 11.6 points, 3.7 assists, and 2.2 rebounds per game. He was named the Big West Player of the Year during his sophomore season.

Personal life
Mitchell's father, Barry Mitchell, played college basketball at Norfolk State and professionally in the Continental Basketball Association and World Basketball League before playing and settling in Belgium.

References

External links
UC Santa Barbara Gauchos bio
RealGM profile

2002 births
Living people
Belgian expatriate basketball people in the United States
Belgian men's basketball players
Limburg United players
People from Ans, Belgium
Point guards
Shooting guards
Sportspeople from Liège
UC Santa Barbara Gauchos men's basketball players